Thomas Luraas (1799–6 June 1886) was a Norwegian rose painter and clarinetist.

He was born in Tinn in Telemark, Norway. He was the son of farmer Øystein Gunnulfson Ingulvsland and Birgit Knutsdotter Mellomgarden Luraas, and was the brother of Hardanger fiddler Knut Luraas. He was regarded among the most prominent painters of his time in the Rosemaling tradition of Telemark. Among his most important decorative works are paintings of the interior at Suigard Juvland in Rauland from 1832, at Gunvaldjord in Haukeli from 1840, and at Lønndalen in Tuddal from 1849.

References

Related reading
Ellingsgard, Nils (1999)  Norsk rosemåling – Dekorativ måling i folkekunsten (Oslo, Det norske samlaget)

External links
Rosemåling  Historikk

1799 births
1886 deaths
People from Tinn
19th-century Norwegian painters
Norwegian folk musicians
Norwegian clarinetists
Norwegian male painters
19th-century Norwegian male artists